Düberck & Dohmen, known as René Dohmen and Joachim Duerbeck, is the music duo which composes music for film & television, series,
documentaries, theatre, commercials and artists. Their work covers a lot of ground - from classical songwriting to electronic music - as well as orchestral and abstract experimental.

Early life 

The musical life of Joachim (born 9 December 1967) and René (born 16 June 1966) began as teenagers, when they used to play in bands; René played guitar in punk bands and Jumpel drums in pop and jazz bands. Then, after school they formed a band. Over the course of eight years they released three albums and seven singles with EMI Germany. Duerbeck and René played over 400 gigs in Germany, the Netherlands and the UK. Then, after splitting up the band, they founded their own company and studio and started writing and producing music for films. Since then they have been writing scores for numerous films and documentaries.

Career 

Inside their Cologne-based studios, Joachim and René have been producing music for many motion pictures and TV shows since 2000. The movies Chandani: The Daughter of the Elephant Whisperer and Belltracchi: The Art of Forgery, for which Düberck & Dohmen scored the music, won the German Film Award LOLA in the category "Best Children's movie".
As musicians and producers, they are also active in various bands and projects. Düberck & Dohmen are members of the German Film Academy and the European Film Academy.

Cinematique Instruments 

Cinematique Instruments is a brand of rare and unique instrument sound libraries produced by Dürbeck & Dohmen.

Filmography 

 2002: Freitagnacht, Theatrical film
 2003: Was ich dir sagen wollte, Short film by Freyas
 2003: MIa, Short film by Philipp Schäfer
 2004: Notruf, Documentary Series 
 2004: Feuer, Theatrical film by Hardi Sturm
 2004: Klippenberger - Der Film, Documentary by Jörg Kobel
 2004: Todesstrafe für eine Lüge, Documentary by Peter F. Müller
 2004: Magic Eye, Theatrical film by Kujtim Çashku
 2005: Nachtasyl, TV film by Hardi Sturm
 2006: Abenteuer Glück, Documentary Series by Annette Dittert
 2006: 37 ohne Zwiebeln, Short film by André Erkau
 2006: Sie hat sich benommen wie eine Deutsche, Documentary by Gert Monheim
 2006: Der Gotteskrieger und seine Frau, Documentary by Gert Monheim
 2007: Liebespfand, Short film by Matthias Klimsa
 2007: Absolution, Short film by Markus Sehr
 2008: Up, Up to the Sky, Theatrical film by Hardi Sturm
 2008: , Theatrical film by André Erkau
 2008: Tatort - Auf der Sonnenseite, TV series by 
 2009: Mamma kommt!, TV film by Isabel Kleefeld
 2009: Der verlorene Sohn, TV film by Nina Grosse
 2010: U.F.O, TV film by Burkhard Feige
 2010: Tatort - Vergissmeinnicht, TV series by 
 2010: Anduni, Theatrical film by Samira Radsi
 2010: Kreutzer kommt, TV film by 
2010: Chandani: The Daughter of the Elephant Whisperer, documentary by Arne Birkenstock
 2011: , Theatrical film by André Erkau
 2011: Holger sacht nix, TV film by Thomas Durchschlag
 2012: Die Lottokönige, TV series by Dominic Müller
 2012: Wie Tag und Nacht, TV film by Sibylle Tafel
 2012: Kreutzer kommt ins Krankenhaus, TV film by 
 2012: Stubbe – Von Fall zu Fall, TV series by Frauke Thielecke
 2012: Unterwegs mit Elisa, TV film by Bettina Woernle
 2013: Free Fall, Theatrical film by Stephan Lacant
 2014: Der letzte Mentsch, Theatrical film by Pierre-Henri Salfati
 2014: Tatort - Der Irre Iwan, TV series by 
 2014: 10 000 000 000, Theatrical Documentary by Valentin Thurn
 2015: The secret life of me, Theatrical film by Laurie Shearing and Ricardo De Los Rios
 2015: Tatort - Schwanensee, TV series by André Erkau
 2015: Die Füchsin, TV film by Samira Radsi

External links 

  Dürbeck & Dohmen
 Official website "Cinematique Instruments"
 

German film score composers